This is a list of all sovereign states and dependencies by total fertility rate (TFR): the expected number of children born per woman in her child-bearing years.

Methodology 
The first lists show the most recent year where there is published total fertility rate (TFR) data ranked by sovereign states and dependencies, and are ordered by organization type - Intergovernmental, Governmental or Non-governmental organization that searched, organized and published the data.

Country ranking by most recent years lists:

Intergovernmental organizations ranking lists

The United Nations Population Fund ranking is based on the data for the 2022 published online. The United Nations Population Fund (formerly the United Nations Fund for Population Activities - UNFPA) is an UN agency aimed at improving reproductive and maternal health worldwide. This agency collects and analyses information on demography issues based on its own work and national sources.

The World Bank ranking list is based on the data for the year 2020 published online. The World Bank is a United Nations international financial institution, a component of the World Bank Group, and a member of the United Nations Development Group, but it also collects and analyses information on demography issues based on international and national sources: (1) United Nations Population Division. World Population Prospects, (2) United Nations Statistical Division. Population and Vital Statistics Report (various years), (3) Census reports and other statistical publications from national statistical offices, (4) Eurostat: Demographic Statistics, (5) Secretariat of the Pacific Community: Statistics and Demography Programme, and (6) U.S. Census Bureau: International Database.

Note: Sometimes World Bank changes its figures of fertility rates for a certain year due to more accurate and updated information from sources. Because of that, sometimes it is necessary to update World Bank figures for fertility rates more than once for the same year.

Governmental organizations ranking lists

The CIA ranking list is sourced from the CIA World Factbook for the most recent year unless otherwise specified. Sovereign states and countries are ranked. Some countries might not be listed because they are not fully recognized as countries at the time of this census.

The INED - Institut National d'Études Démographiques is based on the online publication Population & Sociétés - Tous les pays du monde (2019), number 569, September 2019.

Non-governmental organizations ranking lists

The Population Reference Bureau (PRB) ranking list is based on the data of the 2021 World Population Data Sheet published online. The PRB is a private, nonprofit organization which informs people around the world about population, health and the environment for research or academic purposes. It was founded in 1929. World Population Data Sheets are double-sided wallcharts (now published online) that present detailed information on demographic, health and environment indicators for more than 200 countries.

Note: Changes in figures of fertility rates by country from one year to another do not always reflect an actual increase or decrease of fertility rates in a certain country but instead reflect a change made due to more accurate and updated information from sources.

The Our World In Data (OWID) Country ranking 2019 list is sourced and based on the OWID website (on the clickable map and quoted sources). (OWID) is an online publication that presents empirical research and data that show how living conditions around the world are changing. The aim is to show how the world is changing and why. The publication is developed at the University of Oxford and authored by social historian and development economist Max Roser.

Comparison ranking lists:

The Our World In Data (OWID) Country ranking and comparison by TFR: 1950 and 2015 list is sourced and based on the OWID website (on the clickable map and quoted sources). Our World In Data (OWID) is an online publication that presents empirical research and data that show how living conditions around the world are changing. The aim is to show how the world is changing and why. The publication is developed at the University of Oxford and authored by social historian and development economist Max Roser.

The World Bank Country ranking and comparison by TFR: 1960 and 2015 list is sourced and based on the online published demographic data of the World Bank website (on the clickable map and quoted sources).

The Population Reference Bureau (PRB) Country ranking and comparison by TFR: 1970 and 2013 list is sourced and based on the data of the 2014 World Population Data Sheet published online.

Forecast/prediction ranking lists:

The UN ranking list is sourced from the United Nations World Population Prospects. Figures are from the 2015 revision of the United Nations World Population Prospects report, for the period 2015–2020, using the medium assumption. and from the 2019 revision United Nations World Population Prospects report, for the period 2020–2025, using the medium assumption.
The United Nations Population Division (part of the DESA - Department of Economic and Social Affairs) ranking list is based on the forecast/prediction for the years 2015-2020 and 2020-2025 published online.

Only countries/territories with a population of 100,000 or more in 2019 are included. Ranks are based on the 2015–2020 and 2020-2025 figures.

Country ranking by most recent year

Country ranking by intergovernmental organizations 

Note:
(-) Data unavailable, inapplicable, not collected, or country or dependent territory not included. Sovereign states and dependent territories listed by alphabetical order, not ranked.

Country ranking by governmental organizations 

Note:
 
(-) Data unavailable, inapplicable, not collected, or country or dependent territory not included. Sovereign states and dependent territories listed by alphabetical order, not ranked.

Country ranking by nongovernmental organizations 

Note:

(-) Data unavailable, inapplicable, not collected, or country or dependent territory not included. Sovereign states and dependent territories listed by alphabetical order, not ranked.

Country ranking and comparison of TFR by year

1950 and 2015 

Notes:

(→) Country that changed name and flag, dependent territory that is now an independent country (sovereign state) from another current or extinct (dissolved) state or empire, former dependent territory from a sovereign state or empire that was included in another sovereign state.

(-) Data unavailable, inapplicable, not collected, or country or dependent territory not included. Sovereign states and dependent territories listed by alphabetical order, not ranked.

1960 and 2015 

Notes:

(→) Country that changed name and flag, dependent territory that is now an independent country (sovereign state) from another current or extinct (dissolved) state or empire, former dependent territory from a sovereign state or empire that was included in another sovereign state.

(-) Data unavailable, inapplicable, not collected, or country or dependent territory not included. Sovereign states and dependent territories listed by alphabetical order, not ranked.

1970 and 2014 

Notes:

(→) Country that changed name and flag, dependent territory that is now an independent country (sovereign state) from another current or extinct (dissolved) state or empire, former dependent territory from a sovereign state or empire that was included in another sovereign state.

(-) Data unavailable, inapplicable, not collected, or country or dependent territory not included. Sovereign states and dependent territories listed by alphabetical order, not ranked.

Country ranking by TFR forecast 

Note:

(-) Data unavailable, inapplicable, not collected, or country or dependent territory not included. Sovereign states and dependent territories listed by alphabetical order, not ranked.

See also

Total fertility rate
List of countries by past fertility rate
List of countries by number of births
List of sovereign states and dependent territories by birth rate
List of people with the most children
List of population concern organizations
Population growth
Sub-replacement fertility
Fertility and intelligence

Case studies:
Ageing of Europe
Aging of Japan
Christian population growth
Muslim population growth

References

Fertility rate
Fertility rate
Human geography
Fertility
Demographic economics